Dharma Vijaya is a 1959 Indian Kannada-language film, directed by N. Jagannath and produced by T. Madar. The film stars Rajkumar, Narasimharaju, Siddayyaswamy and Sadashivaiah. The film has musical score by G. K. Venkatesh. Midway through the movie, M. R. Vittal assumed the responsibilities of directing the movie and completed the shoot though he refused to be credited as the director.

Cast

Rajkumar as Saradara Vijaya
Narasimharaju as Kaushika
Siddayyaswamy
Sadashivaiah
Sorat Ashwath
Krishna Shastry
Ramachandra Shastry
Mahalinga Bhagavathar
Vasudeva Girimaji
Hanumantha Rao
Vadiraj
Madhu
Master Venkatesh
Rathnakar
Ramarao
M. N. Aradhya
Harini as Saradara Vijaya's wife
Hemalatha
Leelavathi
Geetha
Lakshmi
Rajalakshmi

Soundtrack

References

External links
 
 

1959 films
1950s Kannada-language films
Films scored by G. K. Venkatesh